Saemundssonia laticaudata is an insect species first described in 1869. It is part of the Saemundssonia genus and the Philopteridae family. It is a parasite of the Greater crested tern.

References

Lice
Insects described in 1869